The Battle of Dębe Wielkie was fought on 31 March 1831.  The Polish army, led by Jan Skrzynecki, won over Russian curtain forces commanded by General Geismar.

Background
Following the battle of Grochów of 25 February, the Russian advance under General Hans Karl von Diebitsch through Praga did not occur, and he decided to cross Vistula river south of the city trying to take it "from land".

Battle
The Poles, numbering some 40,000 men (both bayonets and sabres) and 116 cannons on March 31, 1831 advanced from Praga on the nearby standing Russian vanguard under General Geismar and attacked it. Maneuvering and retreating all day, Geismar went to the village of Debe Wielkie by 4 p.m. Russian force was almost  finished but arrival of three fresh regiments allowed Geismar to get out of trouble and take hold at the town of Siedlce.

Aftermath 
Although Poles gained some ground and inflicted heavy casualties on Russians, they did not manage to achieve their main goal — to finish Rosen's Observation Corps and expose Diebitsch's line of supply.

Literature
Memoire of baron Geismar published by Vladimir Geismar and comments on them. "Russkaya Starina" — 1881, book 5; 1882, book 1.

Conflicts in 1831
Debe Wielkie
March 1831 events